Ramabai Bhimrao Ambedkar (7 February 1898 – 27 May 1935) was the first wife of B. R. Ambedkar, who said her support was instrumental in helping him pursue his higher education and his true potential. She has been the subject of a number of biographical movies and books. A number of landmarks across India have been named after her. She is also known as Ramai (Mother Rama).

Early life 
Ramabai was born in a poor family to Bhiku Dhotre (Valangkar) and Rukmini. She lived with her three sisters and a brother, Shankar, in the Mahapura locality within the village of Vanand near Dapoli Ratnagiri. Her father earned his livelihood by carrying baskets of fish from Harnai Bunder & Dabhol harbour to the market. Her mother died when she was young and, after her father also died, her uncles Valangkar and Govindpurkar took the children to Bombay to live with them in Byculla market.

Marriage 

Ramabai married Ambedkar in 1906 in a very simple ceremony in the vegetable market of Byculla, Mumbai. At the time, Ambedkar was aged 15 and Ramabai was Eight. His affectionate name for her was "Rāmu", while she called him "Saheb". They had five children – Yashwant, Gangadhar, Ramesh, Indu (daughter) and Rajratna. Apart from Yashwant (1912–1977), the other four died in their childhood.

Death 
Ramabai died on 27 May 1935 at Rajgruha in Hindu Colony, Dadar, Bombay, after a prolonged chronic illness. She had been married to Ambedkar for 29 years.

Credit by her husband 
B. R. Ambedkar's book Thoughts on Pakistan, published in 1941, was dedicated to Ramabai. In the preface, Ambedkar credits her with his transformation from an ordinary Bhiva or Bhima to Dr Ambedkar.

Influence and in popular legacy 

Ramabai's life has been featured in the following:

Movies, televisions and drama 
 Ramai, a 1992 drama directed by Ashok Gawali
 Bhim Garjana, a 1990 Marathi film directed by Vijay Pawar, the role of Ramabai Ambedkar was played by Prathama Devi.
 Yugpurush Dr. Babasaheb Ambedkar, a 1993 Marathi film directed by Shashikant Nalavade, the role of Ramabai Ambedkar was played by Chitra Koppikar.
 Dr. Babasaheb Ambedkar, a 2000 English film directed by Jabbar Patel, the role of Ramabai Ambedkar was played by Sonali Kulkarni.
 Dr. B. R. Ambedkar, a 2005 Kannada film directed by Sharan Kumar Kabbur, the role of Ramabai Ambedkar was played by Tara Anuradha.
 Ramabai Bhimrao Ambedkar, a 2011 Marathi film directed by Prakash Jadhav, the role of Ramabai Ambedkar was played by Nisha Parulekar.
 Ramabai, a 2016 Kannada film directed by M. Ranganath, the role of Ramabai Ambedkar was played by Yagna Shetty.
 Dr. Ambedkar, a Hindi television series aired on DD National.
 Garja Maharashtra (2018–19), a Marathi television series aired on Sony Marathi.
 Dr. Babasaheb Ambedkar - Mahamanvachi Gauravgatha (2019), a Marathi television series airing on Star Pravah starring Shivani Rangole as Ramabai Ambedkar while Mrunmayi Supal portrayed the young version of the character.

Books 
 Ramai, by Yashwant Manohar
 Tyagawanti Rama Mauli, by Nana Dhakulkar, Vijay Publications (Nagpur)
 Priya Ramu, by Yogiraj Bagul, Granthali Publication

See also 
 1997 Ramabai killings
 Ambedkar family
 Savita Ambedkar

References 

1898 births
1935 deaths
20th-century Indian women
20th-century Indian people
Spouses of Indian politicians
Spouses of national leaders
Ramabai Bhimrao
Women from Maharashtra
People from Ratnagiri district